Ben Raemers (4 November 1990 – 14 May 2019) was a British professional skateboarder. He has been described as one of the greatest British skateboarders ever.

Early life
Ben Raemers was born on 4 November 1990 in Colchester, Essex, England, United Kingdom.

Raemers first started skateboarding at the age of 10 when living in his mothers flat in Walton-on-the-Naze, Essex.

Life and career
Ben rode for various brands throughout his career including Consolidated Skateboards, Lost Art, Volcom and éS Footwear. He ultimately settled to ride for Enjoi, Slam City Skates, Independent Trucks and Cons until his death.

Ben moved from Essex to San Jose, California in 2010 ultimately deciding to move back to London permanently around 2015.

Ben was a cast member in King of the Road 2016.

Death
Raemers died by suicide on 14 May 2019, at the age of 28.

Legacy
The Ben Raemers Foundation was established in 2019 following Ben's death. The Ben Raemers Foundation is a skateboarding organisation that aims to end the stigma and burden that often clouds issues of mental health by bringing awareness of these issues and suicide to the forefront within the wider skateboarding community.

The Ben Raemers Foundation logo is a vectorised silhouette of Ben’s side profile. This logo can be seen on the ramps of a number of skateparks, including Croxley Green skatepark.

References

External links
 BBC article on Raemers. Published 4 July 2022.
 Ben Raemers: Tributes paid to British skateboarder found dead at 28. BBC Sport. Published 18 May 2019.
 Rest in Peace Ben Raemers. Thrasher Magazine. Published 16 May 2019.
 R.I.P. Ben Raemers. Transworld Skateboarding. Published 15 May 2019.
 King of the Road. IMDb.
 Ben Raemers Foundation.

1990 births
2019 suicides
British skateboarders
Sportspeople from Colchester
Suicides in the United Kingdom